The Babies is the debut studio album by American indie rock band The Babies. It was released on February 14, 2011, by Shrimper Records.

Track list

Personnel
The Babies
Kevin Morby – vocals, guitar
Cassie Ramone – vocals, guitar, cover art
Justin Sullivan – drums
Nathanael Stark - bass

Production
Jarvis Taveniere – engineer, bass , guitar and organ

References

2011 debut albums
The Babies albums
Shrimper Records albums